Thomas Alexander Dekker (born December 28, 1987) is an American actor, musician, singer, director and producer. He is known for his roles as John Connor in Terminator: The Sarah Connor Chronicles, Adam Conant on The Secret Circle, and Zach on Heroes.

Dekker did the voice of Littlefoot in The Land Before Time V-IX (singing voice in The Land Before Time V) and as Fievel Mousekewitz in An American Tail: The Treasure of Manhattan Island and An American Tail: The Mystery of the Night Monster. He played Jesse Braun in the 2010 remake of A Nightmare on Elm Street, and Smith in Gregg Araki's film Kaboom. Dekker starred as Gregory Valentine in the TV show Backstrom.

He has also written and produced two albums.

Early life
Dekker was born in Las Vegas, Nevada. His mother, Hilary (née Williams), is a concert pianist, acting coach, actor, and singer from Wales, and his late father, David John Ellis Dekker, was an American artist, set designer, opera singer, and actor of English and Dutch ancestry. His maternal grandfather was Alun Williams, a radio broadcaster for the British Broadcasting Corporation.  As a child, he and his parents moved all over the world, including his mother's native United Kingdom and Canada.

Career

Early career
Starting his acting career at age six, Dekker was first seen in the soap The Young and the Restless. He then appeared in Star Trek Generations, two episodes of Star Trek: Voyager and the film Village of the Damned (1995). Dekker also appeared as a child actor on Seinfeld (season 5, episode 16, 1994) and as Bobby (season 7, episode 4, 1995). In 1997, he became a regular on the Disney Channel show Honey, I Shrunk the Kids: The TV Show which is based on the movie of the same name where he played Nick Szalinski for three years. After the show ended in 2000, he went on to appear in Run of the House, Fillmore!, CSI: Crime Scene Investigation, House, Boston Public, Reba and 7th Heaven. He appeared in films such as Campus Confidential and An American Tail: The Mystery of the Night Monster. Dekker has won three Young Artist Awards for his work in The Land Before Time films and one for his guest appearance on Boston Public. In 2001, he played the part of young Donny Osmond in the film Inside the Osmonds.

2006–present
In 2006, Dekker landed a recurring role on Heroes playing the character of Zach (Claire Bennet's best friend). He played Zach for eleven episodes before leaving Heroes to take a starring role in Fox's new show Terminator: The Sarah Connor Chronicles as John Connor, starring opposite Lena Headey and Summer Glau. That show debuted January 13, 2008 and was canceled on May 18, 2009. Dekker also played the lead character Nate Palmer in the web-based science fiction series IQ-145.

In 2009, Dekker appeared in From Within (filmed in 2007), My Sister's Keeper, a drama in which he starred with Cameron Diaz, Alec Baldwin, Abigail Breslin and Medium star Sofia Vassilieva, and Laid to Rest alongside Lena Headey. In 2010, Dekker starred in the remake of A Nightmare on Elm Street, released on April 30, 2010. His character's name was Jesse Braun, loosely based on the character Rod Lane in the original. That same year he also had a role in All About Evil, an indie horror film.

Dekker starred in Gregg Araki's Kaboom (2010). It is the first film ever awarded the Cannes Film Festival "Queer Palm Award" for its contribution to LGBT presence in cinema. Dekker was a "top candidate" for the lead role in Paramount's remake of Footloose (2011), but the role went to Kenny Wormald. In April 2011, Dekker starred as Lance Loud in the HBO original film Cinema Verite, about the creation of America's first reality television series, An American Family. Dekker played the role of Adam, the male lead on the television series The Secret Circle developed by The CW.

He appeared in Daughtry's music video for their single "Waiting for Superman", which was released September 17, 2013.

Dekker was a regular on the 2015 Fox crime drama Backstrom, playing Gregory Valentine, the gay underworld contact and roommate of Rainn Wilson's title character, revealed to be his half-brother.

Music

Dekker was brought up with a musical background, and started writing music at age ten while living in Canada. At the age of fifteen he landed a record deal; however after feeling that he wasn't as involved in the music as he would have liked, he left to concentrate on making his own music. At the age of sixteen, Dekker started writing and producing his own classical music influenced by electronica which he describes as "electrofolk". His debut album Psyanotic was released in 2008.

Personal life

Dekker has stated that for much of his childhood, he was a victim of sexual molestation. In his teenage years, he was part of a "metalhead" subculture, where he "caused trouble in Las Vegas," and was arrested "five or six times."

Dekker was involved in an auto accident on October 15, 2009, when he hit a 17-year-old cyclist training for a race on a freeway onramp. Originally charged with two counts of felony DUI, the charge was reduced to one count of misdemeanor reckless driving when it was found that the cyclist was at fault. He pleaded no contest, and was sentenced to a fine of $300 and two years of informal probation, and ordered to attend a 12-hour alcohol-education class.

Dekker is a vegan.

On April 20, 2011 in an interview with Out magazine Dekker spoke about his sexuality, which had been the subject of speculation:

On July 13, 2017, Dekker came out as gay and revealed that he married Canadian actor Jesse Haddock in April that year.

Awards
 Young Artist Award  — Best Performance in a TV Comedy Series — Leading Young Actor (Honey, I Shrunk the Kids: The TV Show) (1997)
 Young Artist Award  — Best Performance in a Voice-Over: TV/Film/Video — Young Actor (An American Tail: The Mystery of the Night Monster) (1999)
 Young Artist Award  — Best Performance in a TV Series — Guest Starring Young Actor (Boston Public) (2000)
 Young Artist Award  — Best Performance in a Voice-Over Role (The Land Before Time IX: Journey to the Big Water) (2002)

Filmography

Film

Television

Music videos

Discography

Albums
 Psyanotic (2008)
 Into the Night (2018)
 Tasma (2021)

Soundtracks
 From The Land Before Time V: The Mysterious Island:
 1997: "Friends for Dinner", "Always There", "Big Water"
 From An American Tail: The Treasure of Manhattan Island:
 1998: "Anywhere in Your Dreams"
 From The Land Before Time VI: The Secret of Saurus Rock:
 1998: "Bad Luck", "The Legend of the Lone Dinosaur", "On Your Own"
 From An American Tail: The Mystery of the Night Monster:
 1999: "Get the Facts", "Who Will"
 From The Land Before Time VII: The Stone of Cold Fire:
 2000: "Beyond the Mysterious Beyond", "Good Inside"
 From The Land Before Time VIII: The Big Freeze:
 2001: "Family", "The Lesson"
 From The Land Before Time IX: Journey to the Big Water:
 2002: "Imaginary Friends", "No One Has to Be Alone", "Chanson D'Ennui", "Big Water"
 From 7th Heaven:
 From the episode Red Socks
 2005: "Ac-Cent-Tchu-Ate the Positive"
 2008: "From Within"

References

External links

 
 

1987 births
Living people
20th-century American male actors
21st-century American male actors
21st-century American singers
21st-century American male singers
American male child actors
American male film actors
American people of Dutch descent
American people of English descent
American people of Welsh descent
American male soap opera actors
American male television actors
American male voice actors
American gay actors
American gay musicians
LGBT people from Nevada
Male actors from Las Vegas
Singers from Nevada
20th-century American LGBT people
21st-century American LGBT people